Hymenoxys vaseyi is a North American species of flowering plant in the daisy family known by the common name Vasey's rubberweed. It is native to the southwestern United States, primarily in New Mexico with a few populations in extreme western Texas (El Paso County).

Hymenoxys vaseyi grows in open areas, generally at the edges of forests at elevations of 2100–2800 meters (7000–9300 feet). It is a perennial herb up to 60 cm (2 feet) tall. One plant can produce as many as 50 flower heads in a branching array. Each head has 8-11 yellow ray flowers and 25-80 tiny yellow disc flowers.

References

External links

vaseyi
Flora of New Mexico
Flora of Texas
Plants described in 1882